Martino is a male given name, the Italian form of Martin.

People with the given name Martino 
 Martino Altomonte, Italian Baroque painter of Austrian descent who mainly worked in Poland and Austria
 Martino Cignaroli, Italian Baroque painter also called il Veronese
 Martino Finotto, Italian racing driver, mainly known for his success in touring car and sports car racing
 Martino Gamper, Italian internationally regarded designer based in London
 Martino Martini, Italian Jesuit missionary, cartographer and historian, mainly working on ancient Imperial China
 Martino Olivetti, Italian footballer who played in A.C. Milan, now retired
 Martino Rota, Italian engraver and painter from Dalmatia
 Martino Zaccaria, Italian politician and admiral, Lord of Chios from 1314 to 1329, ruler of several other Aegean islands, and baron of Veligosti–Damala and Chalandritsa in the Principality of Achaea

See also 
 Martin (name)
 Martina (given name)

Italian masculine given names